The Groote Eylandt monitor (Varanus insulanicus) is a medium-sized species of monitor lizard in the family Varanidae. The species is native to Northern Australia. It belongs to the subgenus Odatria.

References

Varanus
Reptiles described in 1958
Reptiles of the Northern Territory
Monitor lizards of Australia
Taxa named by Robert Mertens